This is a list of films produced in the Philippines in the 2000s.

2000

2001

2002

2003

2004

2005

2006

2007

2008

2009

References

External links
 Filipino film at the Internet Movie Database

See also
 List of 2008 box office number-one films in the Philippines
 List of 2009 box office number-one films in the Philippines

2000s
Films
Philippines